The GAZ-5903V Vetluga is a Russian heavy firefighting vehicle produced by GAZ Group, a modified BTR-70 amphibious armored personnel carrier with an externally mounted fire suppression system in a large vertically movable turret. The turret mounts 11 large tubes filled with powdered firefighting chemicals. It is derived from the GAZ-59037. Its purpose is to be able to put out large, high-risk industrial fires, and resolve a variety of other situations involving grave risk of explosion. The crew has a communications system, and filtered ventilation. Extra tools and equipment are also carried.

The vehicle carries enough preloaded extinguishing powder to fire each of the 11 tubes twice, and enough reloads, carried in separate cases, to be able to fire each tube twice again. The powder is expelled by controlled air blasts, which is why the method is called pulsed throwing, or impulse firefighting.

Known Specifications 
 Weight (unloaded): 13,000 kilograms
 Cargo allowance: 5,000 kilograms
 Engine: KamAZ-7403 diesel engine, typical output 191 kilowatts, maximum output 260 kilowatts
 Length: 7.6 meters
 Width: 2.9 meters
 Height: ??
 Length of track assembly 2.41 meters
 Road speed: 80 kilometers per hour
 Water speed: 9 kilometers per hour
 Range: 600 kilometers
 Crew: 2
 Drive mechanism: 8×8
 Turret elevation: -2° to +25° vertical
 Turret firing range: 50–300 meters
 Manufacturing facility: Arzamas mechanical plant

Sources 
 http://www.arms-expo.ru/site.xp/057052.html
 http://autoussr.ru/zavod6.php
 http://www.rusarm.ru/products/dual/g59037.html
 http://legion.wplus.net/index.html?/guide/army/tr/gaz.html
 https://web.archive.org/web/20010426074310/http://www.amz.nnov.ru:8001/index_en.html
 https://web.archive.org/web/20070928093103/http://www.amphibiousvehicle.net/amphi/F_G.html
 http://forum.valka.cz/viewtopic.php/t/41355
 http://autowp.ru/picture/92494

Firefighting equipment
GAZ Group vehicles